Gordon is a surname with numerous origins. The masculine given name Gordon is derived from the surname.

Origin of the surname
The Scottish surname Gordon may be derived from several locations. One possibility is from Gordon, in Berwickshire. Another possibility is from a similarly named place in Normandy. The English surname Gordon is derived from the placename of Gourdon, in Saône-et-Loire, France. This location is derived from the Gallo-Roman personal name Gordus. In Ireland, the surname Gordon is of several origins. One origin of the surname is from the Scottish surname, which spread into Ireland in the 17th century during the plantation era; in the Irish language this name is spelt de Górdún. Also, the surname Gordon is an Anglicised form of the Irish language Mag Mhuirneacháin, which is a patronymic form of the personal name Muirneachán. This personal name is derived from the Irish language word muirneach, meaning "beloved". Another origin of the Irish name Gordon is as an Anglicised form of the Irish language surname Mórbhoirneach.

Gordon is also a Jewish surname, likely derived from the city of Grodno, in Belarus—thus, of an origin completely unrelated to the British surname though spelled the same in English.

The Spanish, and Galician surname Gordón is derived from places like-named in the Spanish and Galician languages. The Basque language Gordon is also derived from a like-named placename. Another origin for the Spanish surname is from the nickname Gordo, which is derived from the Spanish language word gordo, meaning "fat".

Gordon is also a British Romany surname with origins on the Scottish-English Border; during the 17th and 18th century fearing persecution many Gypsy folk in the North of England and the South of Scotland chose to change their surnames to blend into the local societies they were living within. These Gordons are completely unrelated to other ancestral sources of the name.

List of people

A. D. Gordon (1856–1922), Russian Zionist
Aaron Gordon (born 1995), American basketball player
Adam Gordon (disambiguation), multiple people
Adi Gordon (born 1966), Israeli basketball player
Adoniram Judson Gordon (1836–1895), pastor in Boston, Massachusetts, and founder of Gordon College
Agnes Gordon (1906–1967), American bridge player
Al Gordon (born 1953), comic book creator
 Alan Gordon (1917–2011), Australian politician known as Lin Gordon
Alan Gordon (actor), British actor
Alan Gordon (author) (born 1959), American author
Alan Gordon (historian) (born 1968), Canadian historian
Alan Gordon (Scottish footballer) (1944–2010), Scottish footballer
Alan Gordon (soccer), (born 1981), American soccer player
Alan Lee Gordon (1944–2008), American songwriter
Alastair Gordon (born 1976), Australian rower, 2000 Sydney Olympics silver medalist
Albert L. Gordon (1915–2009), American gay rights legal activist
Alexander Gordon (disambiguation), multiple people
Aleksandr Gordon (1931–2020), Russian-Soviet director, screenwriter and actor
Amelia Elizabeth Roe Gordon (1852-1932), British-born Canadian social reformer
Anita Gordon (1929-2015), American singer
Ann Gordon (born 1956), First Lady of North Carolina
Ann D. Gordon, research professor in the department of history at Rutgers University
Anna Gordon (1747-1810), ballad collector
Anna Adams Gordon (1853–1931), American social reformer, songwriter, president of the Woman's Christian Temperance Union
Anne Gordon (born 1941), Australian cricketer
Ann Lee (singer) (born 1967), singer and songwriter
Anthony Gordon (disambiguation), multiple people
Archibald Ronald McDonald Gordon (1927–2015), Bishop of Portsmouth
Audrey Gordon, Canadian politician
Bart Gordon (born 1949), American congressman
Ben Gordon (born 1983), British-born American basketball player
Benjamin Franklin Gordon (1826–1866), Confederate States Army colonel, acting brigadier general
Bernard Gordon (disambiguation), multiple people
Bert I. Gordon (1922–2023), American film director and screenwriter
Bob Gordon (Canadian intelligence), former Canadian Security Intelligence Service agent
Bob Gordon (saxophonist) (1928–1955), American jazz saxophonist
Bobby Gordon (1923–2001), Scottish footballer
Bobby Gordon (American football) (1935–1990), American football player
Boyd Gordon (born 1983), Canadian ice hockey player
Brian Gordon (baseball) (born 1978), American professional baseball pitcher
Brian Gordon, cartoonist, creator of web comics Fowl Language and Chuck & Beans
Bridgette Gordon (born 1967), American basketball player
Bruce Gordon (disambiguation), multiple people
C. Henry Gordon (1883–1940), American actor
Cecil Gordon (1941–2012), American NASCAR driver
Charles George Gordon (1833–1885), British general known as "Chinese Gordon" and "Gordon of Khartoum"
Charles Gordon (disambiguation), multiple people
Christopher Gordon (disambiguation), multiple people
Clarence Gordon (disambiguation), multiple people
Clemente Gordon (born 1967), American football player
Colin Gordon (1911–1972), British actor
Colin Gordon (athlete) (1907–1980), high jumper from British Guiana
Cyrus H. Gordon (1908–2001), American linguist-semitologist
Daniel Gordon (disambiguation), multiple people
David Gordon (disambiguation), multiple people
Dexter Gordon (1923–1990), American jazz tenor saxophonist and actor
Dmitry Gordon, Ukrainian journalist and TV presenter
Donald Gordon (cricketer) (born 1990), English cricketer
Douglas Gordon (born 1966), Scottish artist
Douglas C. Gordon (1956–1998), whitewater kayaker
Douglas Peel Gordon (1892–1948), South Australian politician
Drew Gordon (born 1990), American basketball player
Duke Gordon (1739–1800), 18th-century Scottish librarian
Ed Gordon (athlete) (1908–1971), American long jumper
Ed Gordon (journalist) (born 1960), American television journalist
Edward Gordon (politician) (1885–1964), New Zealand politician
Edythe Mae Gordon (c. 1897 – 1980), American short story writer and poet
 Rabbi Eliezer Gordon (1841–1910), Lithuanian Rosh Yeshiva
Elizabeth Putnam Gordon (1851-1933), American temperance advocate, author
Elye Gordon (1907–1989), Soviet Yiddish writer
Eric Gordon (born 1988), American basketball player
Eric Valentine Gordon (1896–1938), Canadian philologist
Esmé Gordon (1910–1993), Scottish architect
F. C. Gordon (1856–1924), Canadian illustrator
Ferenc Gordon (1893–1971), Hungarian economist and politician
Francis Gordon (1808–1857), English amateur cricketer
Frank X. Gordon Jr. (1929–2020), American lawyer and judge
Fritzi Gordon, Austrian-British bridge player
Gary Gordon (1960–1993), American soldier and Medal of Honor recipient
Gavin Gordon (disambiguation), multiple people
Geoffrey Gordon (composer) (born 1968), American composer
George Gordon (disambiguation), multiple people
 Gordon Gordon (1906–2002), half of a team of American crime fiction writers: The Gordons (writers)
Hannah Gordon (born 1941), Scottish actress
Harry Gordon (entertainer) (1893–1957), Scottish entertainer, comedian and impressionist
Harry Gordon (footballer) (1931–2014), Scottish footballer
Harry L. Gordon (1860–1921), American politician in Ohio
Heather Gordon (born 1967), American contemporary visual artist
Henry Gordon (preacher) (1816–1898), American 
C. Henry Gordon (1883–1940), American actor
Henry C. Gordon (1925–1996), American astronaut
Henry Gordon (magician) (1920–2009), Canadian magician and writer
Herbert Gordon (1898−1965), English cricketer
Herbert Gordon (footballer) (1952–2013), Jamaican footballer
Hilda May Gordon (1874–1972), British painter
Honi Gordon, vocalist
Ian Gordon (footballer) (born 1933), former Australian rules footballer
Ian Gordon (general) (born 1952), Deputy Chief of Army and Commander of UNTSO
Ian Gordon (historian) (born 1964), professor of US history at the National University of Singapore
Ian Gordon (ice hockey) (born 1975), German hockey player
Ida Gordon, English philologist, wife of E. V. Gordon
Isabella Gordon (1901–1988), British biological scientist
James Gordon (disambiguation), multiple people
Janet Hill Gordon (1915–1990), New York politician
Jay Gordon (born 1967), musician
Jeff Gordon (born 1971), American NASCAR driver
Jeffrey D. Gordon, Pentagon spokesman
Jimmie Gordon, American blues pianist, singer, and songwriter
Joe Gordon (1915–1978), American baseball player and manager
John Gordon (disambiguation), multiple people
Josephine Gordon (born 1993), British jockey
Joyce Gordon (1929–2020), American actress and union representative
Judah Leib Gordon (1830–1892), Hebrew poet
Judy Gordon (1948–2020), Canadian politician
Julia Gordon, Canadian mathematician
Juliette Gordon Low (1860–1927), founder of the Girl Scouts of the USA
Karl Gordon, British DJ and producer
Ken Gordon (born in 1930), Trinidadian businessman and former politician
Kim Gordon, American musician, member of Sonic Youth
Kyler Gordon (born 1999), American football player
L. C. Gordon (born 1937), American basketball player and coach
Larry Gordon (disambiguation), multiple people
Lawrence Gordon (disambiguation), multiple people
Lee Gordon (1902–1946), American musician
Lee Gordon (promoter) (1923–1963), American businessman and rock and roll promoter
Lennox Gordon (born 1978), American football player
Leo Gordon (1922–2000), American film and television character actor
Leon Gordon (1889–1943), Russian-born poet
Leonard A. Gordon is a historian of South Asia, especially of Bengal
Lewis Gordon (born 1962), American philosopher
Lewis Gordon, 3rd Marquess of Huntly (c. 1626 – 1653)
Lewis Gordon (civil engineer) (1815–1876)
Lewis Gordon (Jacobite) (1724–1754)
Lincoln Gordon (1913–2009), president of Johns Hopkins University, and U.S. Ambassador to Brazil
Lindsay Gordon (1892–1940), Canadian air marshal
Lucy Gordon (disambiguation), multiple people
M. G. Gordon (1915–1969), American businessman, inventor and social theorist
Manya Gordon (1882–1945), American historian
Margaret Gordon (illustrator) (1939–1989), British artist
Marina Gordon (1917–2013), American singer
Marjory Gordon (1931–2015), American nurse
Marc Gordon (1935–2010), American record producer and music executive
Mark Gordon (born 1956), American film and television producer
Mark Gordon (Wyoming politician) (born 1957), American politician
Mary Gordon (disambiguation), multiple people
Maxine Gordon, British actress
Melvin Gordon (born 1993), American football player
Michael Gordon (disambiguation), multiple people
Mikalah Gordon, (born 1988), American Idol 4 contestant
 Mildred Gordon (1912–1979), half of a team of American crime fiction writers: The Gordons (writers)
Mildred Gordon (politician) (1923–2016), British politician
Nancy Gordon, American economist and statistician
Nathan Gordon (footballer) (born 1990), Australian rules footballer
Nathan Green Gordon (1916–2008), American lawyer, politician, and naval aviator
Nathan H. Gordon (1872–1938), motion picture executive
Nathaniel Gordon (1826–1862), American slave trader
Nick Gordon (born 1995), American baseball player
Noah Gordon (disambiguation), multiple people
Norman Gordon (1911–2014), South African cricketer
Oliver Gordon (disambiguation), multiple people
Paige Gordon (born 1973), Canadian diver
Pamela Gordon (disambiguation), multiple people
Patrick Gordon (disambiguation), multiple people
Paul-Gordon Chandler (born 1964), musician, composer and producer
Peter Gordon (disambiguation), multiple people
Phil Gordon (disambiguation), multiple people
Philip Gordon (born 1962), American diplomat
Powhatan Gordon (1802–1879), American politician
Richard Gordon (disambiguation), multiple people
R. H. Gordon (1844–1917), American politician
Ricky Ian Gordon (born 1956), US composer
Robby Gordon (born 1969), NASCAR driver
Robert Gordon (disambiguation), multiple people
Roderick Gordon (born 1960), children's book author
Rodney Gordon (1933–2008), British architect
Ron Gordon, American entrepreneur and former president of Atari.
Rosco Gordon (1928–2002), American blues singer and pianist
Rupert Montgomery Gordon (1898–1961), British parasitologist
Ruth Gordon (1896–1985), actress
Samuel Y. Gordon (1861–1940), Minnesota legislator and the Lieutenant Governor of Minnesota
Sandy Grant Gordon (1933–2020), Scottish distiller
Shahar Gordon (born 1980), Israeli basketball player
Shaul Gordon (born 1994), Canadian-Israeli Olympic sabre fencer
Sheila Gordon (1927–2013), American writer
Sid Gordon (1917–1975), American major league baseball All Star player
Sidney Gordon (businessman) (1917–2007), Scottish businessman
Stuart Gordon (1947–2020), American director
Stuart Gordon (musician), musician with The Korgis
Stephen J. Gordon (born 1986), English chess grandmaster 
Steve Gordon (cricketer) (born 1967), Cayman Islands cricketer
Steve Gordon (director) (1938–1982), American film and television director
Steve Gordon (rugby league) (born 1986), rugby league footballer
Steven E. Gordon (born 1960), director, character designer and animator
Stomp Gordon (1926–1958), American jump blues pianist and singer
Sue Gordon (born 1943), magistrate
Susan Gordon (1949–2011), child actress
Thomas Gordon (disambiguation), multiple people
Tom Gordon (born 1967), American baseball player
Trevor Gordon (1948–2013), British Australian singer, songwriter and musician
Veronica Lucy Gordon, a South Sudanese journalist
 Walter Gordon (1942–2012), African-American filmmaker known as Jamaa Fanaka
Walter Gordon (physicist) (1893–1939), physicist active in the 1920s
Walter Gordon (veteran) (1920–1997), American World War II veteran
Walter A. Gordon (1894–1976), African-American political figure and American football player for the University of California
Walter Henry Gordon (1863–1924), United States Army General
Walter L. Gordon (1906–1987), Canadian politician and cabinet minister
Wayne Gordon (disambiguation), multiple people
William Gordon (disambiguation), multiple people
Willy Gordon (1918–2003), Swedish sculptor
Yekutiel Gordon, disciple of Rabbi Moshe Chaim Luzzatto
Zachary Gordon (born 1998), American child actor

List of people with a related name
 Sir Alexander Cumming-Gordon, 1st Baronet (1749–1806), Scottish politician
 Catherine Rose Gordon-Cumming (born 1952), Katie Fforde, British romance novelist
 Constance Gordon-Cumming (1837–1924), Scottish travel writer and painter
 Roualeyn George Gordon-Cumming (1820–1866), Scottish traveller and sportsman, known as the "lion hunter"
 Sir William Gordon-Cumming, 2nd Baronet (1787–1854), Scottish Member of Parliament for Elgin Burghs 1831–1832
 Sir William Gordon-Cumming, 4th Baronet (1848–1930), Scottish soldier and adventurer, central figure in the Royal Baccarat Scandal
 Sir Alexander Gordon-Lennox (Royal Navy officer) (1911–1987), admiral of the Royal Navy
 Lord Alexander Gordon-Lennox (1825–1892), British Conservative politician
 Major Lord Bernard Charles Gordon-Lennox (1878–1914), British soldier
 Major-General Bernard Charles Gordon-Lennox (1932–2017), commandant of the British Sector in Berlin
 Lord George Charles Gordon-Lennox (1829–1877), British Conservative politician
 Lieutenant-General Sir George Charles Gordon-Lennox (1908–1988), British soldier
 Hilda Madeline Gordon-Lennox, Duchess of Richmond (1872–1971), first chairman of the National Gardens Scheme
 Ivy Gordon-Lennox (1887–1982), Ivy Cavendish-Bentinck, Duchess of Portland 
 Lord Nicholas Gordon-Lennox (1931–2004), British diplomat
 Lord Walter Charles Gordon-Lennox (1865–1922), British Conservative Party politician
 Joseph Gordon-Levitt (born 1981), American actor

List of nobility
 Duke of Gordon, created once in the Peerage of Scotland, and again in the Peerage of the United Kingdom

Dukes of Aubigny
 Charles Gordon-Lennox, 5th Duke of Richmond, 5th Duke of Lennox, Duke of Aubigny (1791–1860)
 Charles Henry Gordon-Lennox, 6th Duke of Richmond, 6th Duke of Lennox, Duke of Aubigny, 1st Duke of Gordon (1818–1903)
 Charles Henry Gordon-Lennox, 7th Duke of Richmond, 7th Duke of Lennox, Duke of Aubigny, 2nd Duke of Gordon (1845–1928)
 Charles Henry Gordon-Lennox, 8th Duke of Richmond, 8th Duke of Lennox, Duke of Aubigny, 3rd Duke of Gordon (1870–1935)
 Frederick Charles Gordon-Lennox, 9th Duke of Richmond, 9th Duke of Lennox, Duke of Aubigny, 4th Duke of Gordon (1904–1989)
 Charles Henry Gordon-Lennox, 10th Duke of Richmond, 10th Duke of Lennox, Duke of Aubigny, 5th Duke of Gordon (1929–2017)

Earls and Marquesses of Huntly
 Alexander Gordon, 1st Earl of Huntly
 George Gordon, 2nd Earl of Huntly
 Alexander Gordon, 3rd Earl of Huntly
 George Gordon, 4th Earl of Huntly (1514–1562)
 George Gordon, 5th Earl of Huntly
 George Gordon, 1st Marquess and 6th Earl of Huntly (1562–1636)
 George Gordon, 2nd Marquess of Huntly (1592–1649)
 Lewis Gordon, 3rd Marquess of Huntly (c. 1626 – 1653)
 George Gordon, 4th Marquess of Huntly (1649–1716) (1st Duke of Gordon)
 George Gordon, 9th Marquess of Huntly (1761–1853)
 Charles Gordon, 10th Marquess of Huntly (1792–1863)
 Charles Gordon, 11th Marquess of Huntly (1847–1937)
 Douglas Gordon, 12th Marquess of Huntly (1908–1987)
 Granville Charles Gomer Gordon, 13th Marquess of Huntly (born 1944)

Earls and Marquesses of Aberdeen
 George Gordon, 1st Earl of Aberdeen (1637–1720)
 William Gordon, 2nd Earl of Aberdeen (1679–1745)
 George Gordon, 3rd Earl of Aberdeen (1722–1801)
 George Hamilton-Gordon, 4th Earl of Aberdeen (1784–1860)
 George Hamilton-Gordon, 5th Earl of Aberdeen (1816–1864)
 George Hamilton-Gordon, 6th Earl of Aberdeen (1841–1870)
 John Campbell Hamilton-Gordon, 7th Earl of Aberdeen (1847–1934), 1st Marquess of Aberdeen and Temair (1847–1934)
 George Gordon, 2nd Marquess of Aberdeen and Temair (1879–1965)
 Dudley Gladstone Gordon, 3rd Marquess of Aberdeen and Temair (1883–1972)
 David George Ian Alexander Gordon, 4th Marquess of Aberdeen and Temair (1908–1974)
 Archibald Victor Dudley Gordon, 5th Marquess of Aberdeen and Temair (1913–1984)
 Alastair Ninian John Gordon, 6th Marquess of Aberdeen and Temair (1920–2002)
 Alexander George Gordon, 7th Marquess of Aberdeen and Temair (1955–2020)

Earls of Aboyne
 Charles Gordon, 1st Earl of Aboyne (died 1681)
 Charles Gordon, 2nd Earl of Aboyne (died 1702)
 John Gordon, 3rd Earl of Aboyne (died 1732)
 Charles Gordon, 4th Earl of Aboyne (1728–1795)
 George Gordon, 5th Earl of Aboyne (1761–1853) (succeeded as 9th Marquess of Huntly in 1836)

Viscounts of Kenmure
 John Gordon, 1st Viscount of Kenmure (1599–1634)
 John Gordon, 2nd Viscount of Kenmure (died 1639)
 John Gordon, 3rd Viscount of Kenmure (died 1643)
 Robert Gordon, 4th Viscount of Kenmure (died 1663)
 Alexander Gordon, 5th Viscount of Kenmure (died 1698)
 William Gordon, 6th Viscount of Kenmure (died 1715) (attainted 1715)

Descent of titles during attainder:

 Robert Gordon, 7th Viscount of Kenmure (1714–1741)
 John Gordon, 8th Viscount of Kenmure (1713–1769)
 William Gordon, 9th Viscount of Kenmure (c. 1748 – 1772)
 John Gordon, 10th Viscount of Kenmure (1750–1840) (restored 1824)
 Adam Gordon, 11th Viscount of Kenmure (died 1847)

Viscount of Melgum
 John Gordon, 1st Viscount of Melgum (died 1630)

Viscount Gordon

Spanish Gordons
 Mauricio González-Gordon y Diez (1923–2013), Spanish sherry maker and conservationist, descendant of Scottish Gordons

Fictional characters
 Adrian Gordon, protagonist of the horror adventure games The Black Mirror 2 and 3
 Allan Gordon, protagonist of The Surpassing Adventures of Allan Gordon by James Hogg
 Artemus Gordon, United States Secret Service agent in "The Wild Wild West" TV series
 Audrey Gordon, is a host of Australian satirical television cooking show Audrey's Kitchen
 James Gordon, commissioner of Gotham City in Batman
 Barbara Gordon, first Batgirl, now the information broker known as Oracle
 Dr. Bruce Gordon, the original alter-ego of Eclipso
 David "Gordo" Gordon in Lizzie McGuire
 Flash Gordon, lead character of the Alex Raymond comic strip of the same name, and the movie, television, and comic books based on the comic strip
 Sir Frank Gordon character in the 1980s British sitcom Yes Minister
 Lawrence Gordon, fictional character in the first of the Saw franchise
 Maggie Gordon, character in The Last Starfighter
 Melinda Gordon, the title character of Ghost Whisperer
 Meredith Gordon, biological mother of Claire Bennet, and Flint Gordon, Meredith's brother, from Heroes
 Patrick Gordon, fictional character on the second season of the television series Downton Abbey
 Samuel Gordon, protagonist of the award-winning 2001 adventure game The Black Mirror
 Tony Gordon, fictional character on the television series Coronation Street

References

English-language surnames
Anglicised Irish-language surnames
Jewish surnames
Scottish surnames
Spanish-language surnames
Yiddish-language surnames